Önder Şipal (born 1 May 1987) is a Turkish amateur boxer competing in the welterweight (69 kg) division. He is member of Istanbul Fenerbahçe Boxing Club.

His brother Onur Şipal is also an amateur boxer.

Career 
Şipal participated at the 2005 Mediterranean Games in Almería, Spain and won a bronze medal. He boxed a gold medal at the 2009 Mediterranean Games in Pescara, Italy.

At the 2006 European Amateur Boxing Championships held in Plovdiv, Bulgaria, he lost his first match against Ionut Gheorghe.

He won the gold medal in welterweight division at the 2010 World University Boxing Championship held in Ulan Bator, Mongolia.

References 

1987 births
Living people
Fenerbahçe boxers
Welterweight boxers
Turkish male boxers
Boxers at the 2016 Summer Olympics
Olympic boxers of Turkey
Mediterranean Games gold medalists for Turkey
Mediterranean Games bronze medalists for Turkey
Competitors at the 2005 Mediterranean Games
Competitors at the 2009 Mediterranean Games
Mediterranean Games medalists in boxing
European Games competitors for Turkey
Boxers at the 2015 European Games
21st-century Turkish people